Bannu District is a district in Bannu Division of Khyber Pakhtunkhwa province in Pakistan. It was recorded as a district in 1861 during the British Raj. It is one of 26 districts that make up the Khyber Pakhtunkhwa province of Pakistan. It borders North Waziristan to the northwest, Karak to the northeast, Lakki Marwat and Bettani to the southeast, and South Waziristan to the southwest. It is represented in the provincial assembly by four MPAs.

The major industries of Bannu are cloth weaving, sugar mills and the manufacturing of cotton fabrics, machinery and equipment. It is known for its weekly Jumma fair. The district forms a basin drained by the Kurram and Gambila (or Tochi) rivers, which originate in the hills of Waziristan. Although Bannu is surrounded by rugged and dry mountains, it is a fertile place, and early English visitors had been known to refer to it as a "paradise" – see the description by Edwardes quoted by Thornton.

Physical features
The district forms a basin drained by the Kurram River , Gambila River and Tochi river which originate in the hills of Waziristan.

History

The history of Bannu goes back to prehistoric times, due to its strategic location. Sheri Khan Tarakai is an ancient settlement site located in the Bannu District with ruins of the oldest known village settlement in the Bannu region, which was occupied from the late fifth until the early third millennium BC.

The sacred texts of Zend Avesta and Vendidad mentions Varəna, the Avestan predecessor of the name for Bannu, as one of the sixteen most beautiful and perfect lands created by Ahura Mazda. Bannu is the homeland and birthplace of Fereydun;

British era (1861–1947)
After the British annexation of Punjab, then including parts of the North-West Frontier Province (NWFP), the valley was administered by Herbert Edwardes. As a result of his administration, the region became a source of strong support, during the Indian Rebellion of 1857. Although the valley itself was peaceful, it was subject to incursions from the Waziri tribes of the Tochi Valley and the neighbouring hills. The primary export of the region was wheat, Salt and alum were also quarried at Kalabagh.

Bannu Jirga (1947)

On 21 June 1947 in Bannu, a jirga was held by Pashtun leaders including Bacha Khan, his brother Chief Minister Dr Khan Sahib, the Khudai Khidmatgars, members of the Provincial Assembly, Mirzali Khan (Faqir of Ipi), and other tribal chiefs, just seven weeks before the Partition of India. The jirga declared the Bannu Resolution,  which demanded that the Pashtuns be given a choice to have an independent state of Pashtunistan composing all Pashtun territories of British India, instead of being made to join either India or Pakistan. However, the British Raj refused to comply with the demand of this resolution, in response to which the Khudai Khidmatgars boycotted the 1947 North-West Frontier Province referendum for merging the province into Pakistan.

Pashtun National Jirga (2022)

On 11-14 March 2022, the Pashtun National Jirga was held at Mirakhel in Bannu District in order to defend the rights of the Pashtun people in the country. The critical issues which were faced by the Pashtuns were discussed during the jirga in a bid to suggest solutions to them.

Administrative subdivisions
Bannu District is divided into 6 Tehsils and 46 union councils.
 Bannu Tehsil
 Domel Tehsil
 Kakki Tehsil
 Baka Khel Tehsil
 Meryan Tehsil
 Wazir Tehsil
 Gumatti (formerly Frontier Region Bannu)

Provincial and National Assembly Seats 
The district has 4 Provincial Seats in the Khyber-Pakhtunkhwa Assembly while it has 1 seat in National Assembly.

National Assembly 
 NA-39 (Bannu)

Provincial Assembly

Demographics

At the time of the 2017 census the district had a population of 1,210,183, of which 614,911 were males and 595,248 females. Rural population was 1,160,235 (95.87%) while the urban population was 49,948 (4.13%). The literacy rate was 46.55% - the male literacy rate was 66.84% while the female literacy rate was 26.26%. Pashto was the predominant language, spoken by 98.20% of the population.

Religion

Universities in Bannu 
District Bannu has two Universities with one i.e University of Science & Technology, Bannu (USTB), founded in 2005 by Mr. Akram Khan Durrani, the then Chief Minister, has a full degree awarding status and another one as a campus of the University of Engineering & Technology (UET), Peshawar.  USTB offers a wide variety of courses in Science, Engineering and Arts subjects at Bachelors, Master and PhD level. These universities host students from District Bannu, the neighboring districts of Lakki Marwat, Karak, Waziristan  as well as from all over Pakistan.

See also

 Khyber Pakhtunkhwa

References

External links
 "History and Settlement of Bannu, Excerpts from Gazetteer of the Bannu District, 1887", Khyber.org
 Website about Bannu

 
Districts of Khyber Pakhtunkhwa
1861 establishments in British India

sv:Bannu District